Spanish moss (Tillandsia usneoides) is an epiphytic flowering plant that often grows upon large trees in tropical and subtropical climates. It is native to much of Mexico, Bermuda, the Bahamas, Central America, South America, the Southern United States, and West Indies. It has been naturalized in Queensland (Australia). It is known as "grandpa's beard" in French Polynesia.

Most known in the United States, it commonly is found on the southern live oak (Quercus virginiana) and bald cypress (Taxodium distichum) in the lowlands, swamps, and marshes of the mid-Atlantic and southeastern states, from the coast of southeastern Virginia to Florida and west to southern Arkansas and Texas.

The specific name of the plant, usneoides, means "resembling Usnea", a lichen. While it superficially resembles its namesake, it is neither a lichen such as Usnea nor a moss, and it is not native to Spain.

It is a flowering plant (angiosperm) in the family Bromeliaceae (the bromeliads) that grows hanging from tree branches in full sun through partial shade. Formerly, it was placed in the genera Anoplophytum, Caraguata, and Renealmia. The northern limit of its natural range is Northampton County, Virginia, with colonial-era reports of it in southern Maryland, where no populations are now known to exist. Its primary range is in the southeastern United States (including Puerto Rico and the U.S. Virgin Islands) through Argentina, where the climate is warm enough and a relatively high average humidity occurs.

It has been introduced to locations around the world with similar conditions, including Hawaii and Australia.

Description 

The plant has no roots, and its brown, green, yellow, or grey flowers are tiny and inconspicuous. It propagates both by seed and vegetatively by fragments that are carried on the wind and stick to tree limbs or that are carried to other locations by birds as nesting material.

Ecology 

Spanish moss is not parasitic: it is an epiphyte that absorbs nutrients and water through its own leaves from the air and rain falling upon it. While its presence rarely kills the trees on which it grows, it occasionally becomes so thick that, by shading the leaves of the tree, it slows the growth rate of the tree. It can use the water-conserving strategy of crassulacean acid metabolism for photosynthesis.

In the southern U.S., the plant seems to show preferences for southern live oak (Quercus virginiana) and bald cypress (Taxodium distichum) because of their high rates of foliar mineral leaching (calcium, magnesium, potassium, and phosphorus) that provides an abundant supply of nutrients to the epiphytic plant. It can also colonize other tree species such as sweetgum (Liquidambar styraciflua), crepe-myrtles (Lagerstroemia spp.), other oaks, and even pines.

Spanish moss shelters a number of creatures, including rat snakes and three species of bats. One species of jumping spider, Pelegrina tillandsiae, has been found only on Spanish moss. Although widely presumed to infest Spanish moss, in one study of the ecology of the plant, chiggers were not present among thousands of other arthropods identified on the plant.

Culture and folklore 

Spanish moss is often associated with Southern Gothic imagery and Deep South culture, due to its propensity for growing in subtropical humid southern locales such as Alabama, Florida, Georgia, Louisiana, Mississippi, North Carolina, South Carolina, east and south Texas, and extreme southern Virginia.

One anecdote about the origin of Spanish moss is called "The Meanest Man Who Ever Lived", in which the man's white hair grew very long and got caught on trees.

Spanish moss was introduced to Hawaii in the nineteenth century. It became a popular ornamental and lei plant. In Hawaii, it was named "ʻumiʻumi-o-Dole" after the beard of Sanford B. Dole, the first president of the Provisional Government of Hawaii. It is also known as hinahina, ("silvery") borrowing the name of the native heliotrope used in lei until shoreline development made access difficult. It has become a substitute for the native hinahina in lei used for pageantry. In the early 21st century the plant was heavily marketed as "Pele's hair"/"lauoho-o-Pele," which actually refers to a type of filamentous volcanic glass.)

Human uses 

Spanish moss has been used for various purposes, including building insulation, mulch, packing material, mattress stuffing, and fiber. In the early 1900s it was used commercially in the padding of car seats. More than 10,000 tons of processed Spanish moss was produced in 1939. Today, it is collected in smaller quantities for use in arts and crafts, as bedding for flower gardens, and as an ingredient in bousillage, a traditional wall covering material. In some parts of Latin America and Louisiana, it is used in nativity scenes.

In the desert regions of southwestern United States, dried Spanish moss is sometimes used in the manufacture of evaporative coolers, colloquially known as "swamp coolers" (and in some areas as "desert coolers"), which are used to cool homes and offices much less expensively than air conditioners. The cooling technology uses a pump that squirts water onto a pad made of Spanish moss plants; a fan then pulls air through the pad, and into the building. Evaporation of the water on the pads serves to reduce air temperature, cooling the building.

Varieties and cultivars 
 Tillandsia 'Maurice's Robusta'
 Tillandsia 'Odin's Genuina' : a natural variety with brown rather than green or yellow flower petals that is native to Guatemala and Mexico
 Tillandsia 'Spanish Gold'
 Tillandsia 'Tight and Curly'

Hybrids 
 Tillandsia 'Nezley' (Tillandsia usneoides × mallemontii)
 Tillandsia 'Kimberly' (Tillandsia usneoides × recurvata)
 Tillandsia 'Old Man's Gold' (Tillandsia crocata × usneoides)

See also 
 Lace lichen, an organism of similar habit and appearance

References 

 Mabberley, D.J. 1987. The Plant Book. A Portable Dictionary of the Higher Plants. Cambridge University Press, Cambridge. .

External links 

 Spanish Moss: Its History, Nature and Uses — Beaufort County Library 
 Florida Forest Plants
 Florida Spanish Moss: Theory — Does Spanish Moss kill trees?
 What’s in a name? Itla-okla, ʻUmiʻumi-o-Dole, Spanish Moss
 Flowers Used for Lei

Tillandsia
Plants described in 1762
Epiphytes
Flora of the Caribbean
Flora of Central America
Flora of Mexico
Flora of South America
Flora of the Southeastern United States
Flora of the South-Central United States
Flora of the Bahamas
Flora of Bermuda
Flora without expected TNC conservation status